The 3rd Missouri Colored Infantry Regiment was an African-American infantry regiment that served in the Union Army during the American Civil War. It was redesignated as the 67th U.S. Colored Troops Regiment on March 11, 1864.

Service 
The 3rd Missouri Colored Infantry Regiment was organized at Benton Barracks, in St. Louis, Missouri, in the winter of 1863–1864. Designation changed to 67th Regiment United States Colored Troops March 11, 1864. Attached to Dept. of Missouri to March 1864. District of Port Hudson, Louisiana, Dept. of the Gulf, to June 1864. Provisional Brigade, District of Morganza, Dept. of the Gulf, to September 1864. 2nd Brigade, 1st Division, United States Colored Troops, District of Morganza, Dept. of the Gulf, to February 1865. 1st Brigade, 1st Division, United States Colored Troops, District of Morganza, Dept. of the Gulf, to May 1865. Northern District of Louisiana, Dept. of the Gulf, to July 1865.

Detailed Service 
Moved from Benton Barracks, Missouri, to Port Hudson, Louisiana, arriving March 19, 1864, and duty there till June. Moved to Morganza, Louisiana, and duty there till June 1865. Action at Mt. Pleasant Landing, Louisiana, May 15, 1864 (Detachment). Expedition from Morganza to Bayou Sara September 6–7, 1864. Moved to Port Hudson June 1, 1865. Consolidated with 65th Regiment, United States Colored Troops, July 12, 1865.

Commanders 
Colonel Alonzo J. Edgerton

Other soldiers
Spottswood Rice - private in Company A

See also 

List of Missouri Civil War Units
List of United States Colored Troops Civil War units
Missouri in the American Civil War
1st Missouri Regiment of Colored Infantry
2nd Missouri Regiment of Colored Infantry
4th Missouri Regiment of Colored Infantry
18th U.S. Colored Infantry - Raised "at large" in the State of Missouri
Lincoln University of Missouri

Notes

References 
 Dyer, Frederick H. A Compendium of the War of the Rebellion (Des Moines, IA:  Dyer Pub. Co.), 1908.
 
The Civil War Archive
Web site discussing the organization of Missouri "Colored Infantry", including discussions of conditions at Benton Barracks during the winter of 1863–1864.
http://www.usgennet.org/usa/mo/county/stlouis/ct.htm

Units and formations of the Union Army from Missouri
Missouri Infantry, 003
Military units and formations established in 1863
Military units and formations disestablished in 1865
1863 establishments in Missouri